The Solidarity logo designed  by Jerzy Janiszewski in 1980 is considered as an important example of Polish Poster School creations. The logo was awarded the Grand Prix of the Biennale of Posters, Katowice 1981. By this time it was already well known in Poland and became an internationally recognized icon. 

According to the artist, the letters were designed to represent united individuals.  This characteristic font, colloquially known as solidaryca ("Solidaric"), was implemented many times in posters and other pieces of art in different contexts. Notable examples include a film poster for Man of Iron by Andrzej Wajda and, in 1989, a poster by Tomasz Sarnecki designed for the first (semi-)free elections in Poland.

References

Solidarity (Polish trade union)
Polish art
Logos
Symbols introduced in 1980